Douglas Clarke (30 July 1932 – 31 January 2005) was a New Zealand cricketer. He played in six first-class matches for Northern Districts from 1957 to 1961.

See also
 List of Northern Districts representative cricketers

References

External links
 

1932 births
2005 deaths
New Zealand cricketers
Northern Districts cricketers
People from Kaponga